Take My Life is a 1947 thriller novel by the British writer Winston Graham. After her husband is accused of killing a young violinist, a former lover of his, an opera singer investigates the crime herself to clear her husband of murder.

Adaptation
The same year Graham co-wrote the story as a screenplay for the film of the same title directed by Ronald Neame and starring Hugh Williams, Greta Gynt and Marius Goring.

References

Bibliography
 Woods, Tim. Who's Who of Twentieth Century Novelists. Routledge, 2008.

1947 British novels
Novels by Winston Graham
British thriller novels
British novels adapted into films
Novels set in London
Novels about music